Orestes Jordán Cánepa (21 November 1913 – 4 December 1991) was a Peruvian international football player. He was born in Chincha Alta. He participated with the Peru national football team at the 1936 Summer Olympics in Berlin.

References

1913 births
1991 deaths
People from Ica Region
Footballers at the 1936 Summer Olympics
Olympic footballers of Peru
Peruvian footballers
Peruvian Primera División players
Club Universitario de Deportes footballers
Association football midfielders
Peru international footballers